Regarding the canon law of the Catholic Church, canonists provide and obey rules for the interpretation and acceptation of words, in order that legislation is correctly understood and the extent of its obligation is determined.

Authentic interpretation

An "authentic interpretation" is an official and authoritative interpretation of a statute issued by the legislator of the statute. In canon law an authentic interpretation has the force of law.

Besides the Supreme Pontiff (Pope), who has plenary legislative power, several other authorities in the Catholic Church have various grades of legislative power. Primary examples are diocesan bishops and their equivalents, episcopal conferences, and particular councils. Any of these legislators can issue authentic interpretations of their own and their predecessors' laws. Authentic interpretations supersede even administrative decisions of ordinaries and judgments of ecclesiastical courts, because neither of these acts have the force of law which authentic interpretations have. The effect of an authentic interpretation is contingent on the extent of the interpretation:
An authentic interpretation which is presented by way of a law has the same force as the law itself, and must be promulgated. If it simply declares the words which are certain in themselves, it has retroactive force. If it restricts or extends a law or explains a doubtful one, it is not retroactive.

Legislators also can entrust the power to authentically interpret their laws to another. For the 1983 Code of Canon Law, the Code of Canons of the Eastern Churches, and other Papal laws, the Supreme Pontiff has delegated authority of authentic interpretation to the Pontifical Council for Legislative Texts.  The following table lists the authentic interpretations that this dicastery has issued (with Papal approbation).

Table of authentic interpretations

Rules of interpretation
In general, the authentic interpretation of a law may be made by the legislator or his successor or superior, but when this is not the case recourse must be had to what is called magisterial, or doctrinal, interpretation. It is for this latter mode that rules have been formed.

Words

The specific words of a law are understood according to their usual signification, unless it is certain that the legislator intended them to be understood otherwise. When words are unambiguous, they must not be twisted into another, improbable signification. If the intention of the legislator regarding words in question is known, interpretation must accord therewith, rather than with the usual signification of the words, because in this instance the words are said not to be nude but rather clothed with the will of the legislator.

When a law is stated in general terms, it is presumed that no exception was intended; that is, if the general law states no exception, interpreters may not distinguish specific cases. Regarding all interpretations, however, that signification of the words in question is to be preferred that favors equity rather than strict justice. An argument can be made from the contrary signification of the words, provided that it does produce a result that is absurd, inappropriate, or contradicted by another law. Further, the provisions of a prior statute are presumed not to be changed beyond the express signification of the words of a new law.

When a law is penal in nature, its words are to be construed in their strictest sense and not to be extended to cases that are not explicitly stated, but when a law concedes favors, its words are to be interpreted in their widest sense. "In contracts, words are to be taken in their full [plena] meaning, in last wills in a wider [plenior] sense, and in grants of favours in their widest [plenissimi] interpretation". When the signification of words is doubtful, that sense is to be preferred that does not prejudice the rights of a third person, i. e., a person whom the law does not directly affect or concern.

Words of a law are never presumed to be superfluous. Words must be considered in their context. An interpretation of words that renders the law in question futile is a false interpretation. When words are in the future tense, and even when they are in the imperative mood regarding the judge, but not regarding the crime, the penalty is understood to be incurred not ipso facto but only upon judicial sentence. When words are doubtful they must be presumed to favor the subjects thereof and not the legislator.

Benedict XVI's opinion
According to Benedict XVI, the instructions of the Magisterium regarding canon law and its interpretation are binding per se insofar as it teaches of the law. The juridically binding instructions on canonical interpretation of the Magisterium are primarily given in the allocutions of the Supreme Pontiffs to the Tribunal of the Roman Rota.

Pope Benedict XVI, in his address of 21 January 2012 to the Roman Rota, taught that canonical law can only be interpreted and fully understood within the Catholic Church in the light of her mission and ecclesiological structure, and that "the work of the interpreter must not be deprived of "vital contact with ecclesial reality":

Notes

References

Bibliography 
 New Commentary on the Code of Canon Law, ed. by John P. Beal, James A. Coriden, and Thomas J. Green, Paulist Press, 2000.  (hardback),   (paperback, 2002).
 Code of Canon Law Annotated, second English edition, ed. by Ernest Caparros, Michel Thériault, and Jean Thorn, 2004.  (Wilson and Lafleur),  (Midwest Theological Forum).
 Lawrence G. Wrenn, Authentic Interpretations on the 1983 Code, Canon Law Society of America, 1993. .
 Pope Benedict XVI, Address of His Holiness Benedict XVI for the Inauguration of the Judicial Year of the Tribunal of the Roman Rota, 21 January 2012, https://w2.vatican.va/content/benedict-xvi/en/speeches/2012/january/documents/hf_ben-xvi_spe_20120121_rota-romana.html, accessed 29 March 2016.

Attribution
 The entry cites:
Ethelred Taunton, The Law of the Church (London, 1906), s.v.; 
Lucius Ferraris, Bibl. Can., 5 (Rome, 1889), s.v. Lex.

External links
 1983 Code of Canon Law for the Latin Rite (CIC)
 1990 Code of Canon Law for the Eastern Rites (CCEO)
 Apostolic Constitution Pastor Bonus, June 28, 1988, by Pope John Paul II
 Interpretationes Authenticae, Latin text of authentic interpretations through 1998, on Vatican website
 English translation of authentic interpretations, from a 2000 canon law course at the Pontifical College Josephinum in Columbus, Ohio

Jurisprudence of Catholic canon law
Legal interpretation